Outsider house (originally spawned as outsider dance, also known as raw house) is a genre of house music combining elements of deep house, techno, noise, and ambient, with artists embracing lo-fi techniques rather than the polished cleanliness of mainstream deep house and other EDM genres.

The term "outsider dance" was first coined in 2012 by DJ Ben UFO and emphasized by music journalist Scott Wilson, referring to different producers and record labels "operating at the fringes of the fringes" such as Laurel Halo, Anthony Naples. However, Ben UFO himself called the term "off-the-cuff formulation", reacting negatively to the term taking hold and circulating, stating "I'm not exactly happy that it's now being held up as a genre, because I think this outsider thing just doesn't do justice to the artists and their music. ... [outsider house artists] are my friends, we get along well and support each other".

Lo-fi house 
Around mid-2010s, outsider house developed into a new form, known as lo-fi house. Producers like DJ Seinfield, DJ Boring and Ross From Friends combined rough sounds of the parent genre with the aesthetic of melancholy, irony and postmodernism attributed to vaporwave, creating songs "resembling melancholic 1990s deep house recorded to cassette and packaged with a veneer of internet-age irony". While the labels like L.I.E.S., 1080p and Lobster Theremin have carved out a signature sound, attributed to the genre, whereas music is often rough, characterized by muffled drums, fuzzy synths and a gauzy, but also use jazzy piano samples and warm percussion samples.

References

2012 neologisms
House music genres
21st-century music genres
Lo-fi music
Microgenres